McConkey (Irish: Mac Donnachaidh)  is an Irish surname. The surname arose in Scotland from the Irish 'Dál Riata' people. Notable people with the surname include:

Bob McConkey (1895–1961), Irish hurler
Charlie McConkey (born 1955), American politician
Edwin H. McConkey, (born 1931) American biologist
Paul McConkey, British slalom canoeist
Phil McConkey, (born 1957) American former football player
Samuel McConkey, Irish doctor
Shane McConkey, (1969–2009) Canadian professional skier
Thomas David McConkey, (1815–1890) Irish-born Canadian businessman and political figure
Tony McConkey, (born 1963) American politician 

McConkey may also refer to:
McConkey (film), 2013 documentary film
McConkey's Ferry, part of George Washington's crossing of the Delaware River

Anglicised Irish-language surnames